The Ancient Diocese of Uzès is a former Roman Catholic diocese in France.  From the arrival of Christianity in the 5th century until the French Revolution the southern French city of Uzès was the seat of a bishop, a competitor to the local lords.

History
The first historically verified Bishop of Uzès was Constantius, who was present at the Council of Vaison in 442. Other notable bishops were the fourth, Saint Firminus (541-53), who is locally venerated as Saint Firmin and whose relics remain in Uzès Cathedral (dedicated to Saint Theodoritus (Saint Théodorit), martyr, and patron saint of the town), and who was venerated as a patron saint against plague, and Saint Ferreol (553-81).

As the power of territorial magnates dispersed, the bishops obtained the right to strike coinage, a sure sign of their secular power, and the seigneurial right to dispense justice. In the 13th century, at the height of the see's power, the bishop was able to purchase a part of the signory of Uzès. Guillaume de Grimoard du Roure officiated as bishop of Uzès before becoming Pope Urban V.

Like many cloth-manufacturing centers (Uzès manufactures serge), the city and the surrounding countryside were strongly Protestant during the Wars of Religion in the 16th century, which wreaked havoc in the Languedoc regions, and Bishop Jean de Saint Gelais (1531–60) became a Calvinist. Many of the city's churches were burned by Huguenots and only two remain.

The celebrated missionary Bridaine, (1701–67), was a native of the diocese of Uzès. For seventy days the little city was the fortified residence of Cardinal Pacca, after his confinement at Fenestrelles (1812). The town of Pont Saint Esprit, on the Rhône, owes its names to a bridge built there between 1265 and 1309 with the proceeds of a general collection made by the monks.

After the bishopric of Nîmes was re-established as a separate diocese in 1821, a Papal Brief of 27 April 1877, granted to its bishop the right to add Alais and Uzès to their bishopric, with the two dioceses being combined with that of Nîmes.

Bishops

See also 
 Catholic Church in France
 List of Catholic dioceses in France

References

Bibliography

Reference Sources
 pp. 548–549. (Use with caution; obsolete)
  p. 301. (in Latin)
 p. 175.

 p. 219.

Studies

External links
,Uzès Cathedral
St. Theodoritus

 
Uzes